Chippewa River is located in Algoma District of Ontario, Canada, located approximately  north of Sault Ste. Marie, Ontario, flowing into Batchawana Bay of Lake Superior.

See also
 List of rivers of Ontario

External links

Tributaries of Lake Superior
Rivers of Algoma District